Gavan John Troy (born 31 May 1940) is a former Australian politician who was a Labor Party member of the Legislative Assembly of Western Australia from 1983 to 1993. He served as a minister in the governments of Brian Burke, Peter Dowding, and Carmen Lawrence.

Troy was elected to the seat of Mundaring in 1983, winning his seat by 16 votes. He served until the electorate was abolished in 1989. From 1989 until 1993, he represented the electorate of Swan Hills.

Troy was one of three ministers sacked during a cabinet reshuffle in early 1991 and was the only one to stay in the parliamentary Labor Party.

In 2004 Troy was appointed to a two-year term as commissioner for the Shire of York.

References

1940 births
Living people
Australian Labor Party members of the Parliament of Western Australia
Curtin University alumni
Members of the Western Australian Legislative Assembly
People educated at Governor Stirling Senior High School
Politicians from Perth, Western Australia
Western Australian local councillors